Hypodoxa muscosaria, the textured emerald, is a moth of the family Geometridae first described by Achille Guenée in 1857. It is found along the east coast of Australia.

The wingspan is about 40 mm.

References

Moths described in 1857
Pseudoterpnini
Moths of Australia